The Al Qasimi (spelled sometimes as Al Qassimi or Al Qassemi; plural: Al Qawasem  and, archaically, Joasmee) is an Arab dynasty in the Persian Gulf that rules Sharjah  and Ras Al Khaimah, today forming two of the seven emirates of the United Arab Emirates. They are one of the longest reigning royal families in the Arabian peninsula. 

Historically, the "Qawasim" were a confederation of Sunni tribes in south eastern Gulf region surrounding the cities of Ras al-Khaimah and Sharjah; and faced strong rivalry with the Omani empire for naval domination along the Persian Gulf. Due to their allegiance to the Wahhabi Emirate of Dir'iyah, the British Empire branded them as "pirates" and fought two major military campaigns against them in 1809 and 1819.

Origin

The dynasty claims to be descended from the Islamic prophet Muhammad. During the 18th century, Arabian Peninsula witnessed a revolutionary socio-political and religious transformation under the reformers of the Muwahhidun (Unitarian) movement led by Muhammad ibn 'Abd al-Wahhab, often referred to by outsiders as "Wahhabis". Embracing his ideals, Qasimis robustly championed the doctrines of the Muwahhidun in the Gulf region and became a close ally of the Emirate of Diriyah. 

By the early 19th century, Emirate of Dir'iyah had begun appointing Qasimi governors to implement Wahhabi religious doctrines and defend their interests. Thus, while Dir'iyah  directly sought to consolidate their Arabian territories and its economic sovereignty, Qawasim acted as Wahhabi privateers for safeguarding the maritime interests of Dir'iyah in the Persian Gulf. With the help of Wahhabis; the Qawasim emerged as a maritime power based both in Ras Al Khaimah on the Southern shore of the Persian Gulf and Qishm, Bandar Abbas and Lingeh on the Persian shore in the 19th-century.

Maritime power

With military and financial aid from the Emirate of Dir'iyah, Qasimis began spreading Wahhabi doctrines across the Gulf region. They had a powerful naval force and sought to end the rising European colonial infiltration on their trade and commercial routes.   

The British-allied Omani Empire, also a rival of the Emirate of Dir'iyah, had been the traditional enemy of the Qawasim over issues related to border disputes, religious differences and naval dominance in the Gulf. Al Qasimi's control of trade in the Persian Gulf area led to wars with Oman and eventually with Oman's ally, Britain, and to the Al Qasimi being labelled by the British as pirates. This led to the identification of the southern shore of the Persian Gulf as the 'Pirate Coast', although following the General Maritime Treaty of 1820 and the 1853 Perpetual Maritime Peace, the various coastal emirates in the area became known as the Trucial States.  

Beginning from 1804, there emerged a spike in Wahhabi-Qasimi naval attacks on British fleet and trading ships. Following decades of incidents where British shipping had fallen foul of the aggressive Al Qasimi, a first British expeditionary force embarked for Ras Al Khaimah in 1809, the Persian Gulf campaign of 1809. This campaign led to the signing of a peace treaty between the British and Hussan Bin Rahmah, the Al Qasimi leader. This treaty broke down in 1815 and, in 1819, the British  mounted a second, altogether more successful, punitive campaign against the Al Qasimi in Ras Al Khaimah under William Keir Grant.

The case against the Al Qasimi has been contested by the historian, author and current Ruler of Sharjah, Sultan bin Mohammed Al Qasimi in his book The Myth of Arab Piracy in the Gulf, in which he argues that the charges amount to a 'casus belli' by the East India Company, which sought to limit or eliminate the 'informal' Arab trade with India, and presents a number of internal communications between the Bombay Government and its officials, which shed doubt on many of the key charges made by British historian J.G. Lorimer in his seminal history of the affair. 

At the time, the Chief Secretary of the Government of Bombay, F. Warden, presented a minute which laid blame for the piracy on the Wahhabi influence on the Al Qasimi and the interference of the East India Company in native affairs. Warden also successfully argued against a proposal to install the Sultan of Muscat as Ruler of the whole peninsula. Warden's arguments and proposals likely influenced the shape of the eventual treaty concluded with the Sheikhs of the Gulf coast.

That 1820 treaty asserted, 'There shall be a cessation of plunder and piracy by land and sea on the part of the Arabs, who are parties to this contract, for ever.' It then goes on to define piracy as being any attack that is not an action of 'acknowledged war'. The 'pacificated Arabs' agreed, on land and sea, to carry a flag being a red rectangle contained within a white border of equal width to the contained rectangle, 'with or without letters on it, at their option'. This flag was to be a symbol of peace with the British government and each other.

The treaty having been signed by Keir Grant and all of the Trucial Rulers, the Government in Bombay made clear that while it was happy with Grant's management of the military expedition, it was most dissatisfied with his leniency over the coastal tribes and desired, 'if it were not too late, to introduce some conditions of greater stringency'. Grant's response was spirited, pointing out that to have enforced extreme measures would have meant pursuing the chiefs into the interior rather than accepting their voluntary submission. This would have contravened Grant's instructions. In the end, Bombay allowed the treaty to stand.

Alongside their stronghold in the Persian Gulf & Gulf of Oman the Qawasem were active both militarily and economically in the Gulf of Aden and as far west as the Mocha on the Red Sea. They had numerous commercial ties with the Somalis, leading vessels from Ras Al Khaimah and the Persian Gulf to regularly attend trade fairs in the large ports of Berbera and Zeila. In the 1830s the Isaaq Sultan Farah Guled and Haji Ali penned a letter to Sultan bin Saqr Al Qasimi of Ras Al Khaimah requesting military assistance and joint religious war against the British.

The Al Qasimi rulers of Ras Al Khaimah (capital to 1819) and Sharjah (capital from 1820) 

 Sheikh Rahma bin Matar Al Qasimi (1722–1760) 
 Sheikh Rashid bin Matar Al Qasimi (1760–1777)
 Sheikh Saqr bin Rashid Al Qasimi (1777–1803)
 Sheikh Sultan bin Saqr Al Qasimi (1803–1808) 
 Sheikh Hassan bin Rahma Al Qasimi (1814–1820)
 Sheikh Sultan bin Saqr Al Qasimi (1820–1866) 
 Sheikh Khalid bin Sultan Al Qasimi (1866-1867)

List of Ras Al Khaimah rulers

 Sheikh Ibrahim bin Sultan Al Qasimi (1866 – May 1867)
 Sheikh Khalid bin Sultan Al Qasimi (May 1867 – 14 April 1868) 
 Sheikh Salim bin Sultan Al Qasimi (14 April 1868 – 1869) 
 Sheikh Humaid bin Abdullah Al Qasimi (1869 – August 1900) 
 Sheikh Khalid bin Ahmad Al Qasimi (1914–1921) 
 Sheikh Sultan bin Salim Al Qasimi (19 July 1921 – February 1948)
 Sheikh Saqr bin Mohammad Al Qassimi (February 1948 – 27 October 2010) 
 Sheikh Saud bin Saqr Al Qasimi (27 October 2010 – present)

List of Sharjah rulers 

 Sheikh Sultan bin Saqr Al Qasimi (1803-1866)
Sheikh Khalid bin Sultan Al Qasimi (1866 – 14 April 1868)
 Sheikh Salim bin Sultan Al Qasimi (14 April 1868 – March 1883) 
 Sheikh Ibrahim bin Sultan Al Qasimi (1869 – 1871)  
 Sheikh Saqr bin Khalid Al Qasimi (March 1883 – 1914)
 Sheikh Khalid bin Ahmad Al Qasimi (13 April 1914 – 21 November 1924) 
 Sheikh Sultan bin Saqr Al Qasimi II (21 November 1924 – 1951)
 Sheikh Saqr bin Sultan Al Qasimi (May 1951 – 24 June 1965) - first time ruling
 Sheikh Khalid bin Mohammed Al Qasimi (24 June 1965 – 24 January 1972) 
 Sheikh Saqr bin Sultan Al Qasimi (25 January 1972 – 1972) - second time ruling
 Sheikh Sultan bin Muhammad Al Qasimi (1972 – 17 June 1987) - first time ruling 
 Sheikh Abdulaziz bin Mohammed Al Qasimi (17–23 June 1987) removed previous sheikh during coup in Sharjah
 Sheikh Sultan bin Muhammad Al Qasimi (23 June 1987 – present) - second time ruling after being restored

Current Al Qasimi rulers
 Sultan bin Muhammad Al-Qasimi, ruler of the emirate of Sharjah, UAE
 Saud bin Saqr Al Qasimi, ruler of the emirate of Ras Al Khaimah, UAE

Historical flags

See also
List of Sunni Muslim dynasties

External links
Al Qasimi Family Tree
Photo of current Al Qasimi rulers

References

 
Emirati Sunni Muslims
Arab dynasties
Wahhabi dynasties